A by-election was held for the Kelantan State Assembly seat of Chempaka on 22 March 2015 following the nomination day on 10 March 2015. The seat fell vacant after the death of the incumbent five-term assemblyman and former Menteri Besar of Kelantan, Nik Abdul Aziz Nik Mat from prostate cancer in Kubang Kerian, Kelantan on 12 February 2015. Niz Aziz was a member of PAS, part of the Pakatan Rakyat coalition. Nik Abdul Aziz had retained the seat in the 13th General Election in 2013 by beating Wan Razman Wan Abd Razak of the Barisan Nasional with a majority of 6,500 votes.

The Chempaka by-election saw a five-way battle between PAS's Ahmad Fathan Mahmood and independent candidates Izat Bukhary Ismail Bukhary, Fadzillah Hussin, Aslah Mamat and Sharif Mahmood. Sharif Mahmood is the vice-president of Malay rights group Perkasa and also a member of the United Malays National Organisation (UMNO).  He and Fadzillah Hussin were sacked by UMNO for contesting in the Chempaka by-election. UMNO had resolved not to contest the election, ostensibly to focus on flood relief efforts in Kelantan.

Results 

PAS candidate Ahmad Fathan Mahmood won the election with a landslide garnering 96.4% of the votes. All four independent candidates lost their election deposits for failing to garner 10% of the votes.

References 

Politics of Kelantan
2015 elections in Malaysia
2015 Chempaka by-election
Elections in Kelantan